Sunk Lake is a small lake lying between Deep Lake and the coast at Cape Royds, Ross Island. The descriptive name appears on the maps by the British Antarctic Expedition (1910–13), but it may have been given earlier by the British Antarctic Expedition (1907–09).

Lakes of Ross Island